, previously known as MIO, is a Japanese pop singer and vocal trainer from Minato, Tokyo. She is known for her performances on the soundtracks of various anime, notably the theme songs of Sunrise's Combat Mecha Xabungle Aura Battler Dunbine Heavy Metal L-Gaim Star Musketeer Bismark and Mobile Suit Gundam 0083 Stardust Memory. The throaty, soulful timbre of her voice was uncharacteristic of Japanese vocalists of the 1980s (although it has become more commonplace today).

MIQ has listed Aretha Franklin, Anita Baker, and Chaka Khan as influences on her vocal style. Her vocal delivery was a major reason she was signed to a contract with King Records. She is also fairly fluent in English as is evident by her English renditions of "Dunbine Tobu" and "Time for L-Gaim" and noted by fellow anime theme singer Ichirou Mizuki at ANIME JAPAN FES IN HK 2007 in Hong Kong.

Partial discography

"HEY YOU" – Combat Mecha Xabungle Insert song (1982)
 – Combat Mecha Xabungle Insert song (1982)
"GET IT!" – Xabungle Grafiti Theme song (1983)
 – Aura Battler Dunbine Opening Theme (1983)
 – Aura Battler Dunbine Ending Theme (1983)
 – Heavy Metal L-Gaim Opening Theme (1984)
 – Heavy Metal L-Gaim Ending Theme (1984)
 – Area 88 OVA Ending Theme (1985)
 – Sei Jūshi Bismarck Opening Theme (1985)
 – Sei Jūshi Bismarck Ending Theme (1985)
"MEN OF DESTINY" – Mobile Suit Gundam 0083: Stardust Memory Opening Theme (1991)
"Evergreen" – Mobile Suit Gundam 0083: Stardust Memory Ending Theme (1991)
 – Super Robot Wars Original Generation (2006)
 – Commercial for Yodobashi Camera (1991)
"ICE MAN" – Super Robot Wars Alpha – (2000)
"Extreme Ki!" – Juken Sentai Gekiranger Insert song (2007)

Albums
 スターライト・シャワー（1984）
 Mr. Monday Morning（1985）
 aesthetic（1986）
 Best of MIQ-MIQUEST-魂は刻をこえて・・・（2005）
 MIO(MIQ)パーフェクト・ベスト（2011）
 STARLIGHT SHOWER（2012）
 Mr. Monday Morning（2012）

References

External links 
 MIQ @ hiMe story 
 
 Official blog 

1955 births
Living people
Japanese women singers
Anime musicians
Singers from Tokyo